Jun Tae-soo (March 2, 1984 – January 21, 2018) was a South Korean actor. He was best known for his role on the popular 2010 television series Sungkyunkwan Scandal.

Biography 
Jun Tae-soo was born on March 2, 1984, in Boryeong, South Chungcheong Province, South Korea. His older sister is acclaimed South Korean actress Ha Ji-won. He studied sculpture at Seowon University.

Jun made his acting debut in 2007 and later gained popularity playing the antagonist on the hit 2010 television series Sungkyunkwan Scandal. He appeared next in the sitcom All My Love For You, but left the series in 2011 after being arrested for assaulting a taxi driver and two policemen while he was under the influence of alcohol. His last acting role was on the 2013 television series The King's Daughter, Soo Baek-hyang.

Jun died at his home on January 21, 2018, of an apparent suicide. He was being treated for depression at the time of his death.

Filmography

Television

Film

Music video

References

External links
  
 Jun Tae-soo at Cyworld 
 

1984 births
2018 deaths
South Korean male film actors
South Korean male television actors
21st-century South Korean male actors
2018 suicides
Suicides in South Korea
People from Boryeong